The 6th Infantry Division was an infantry division of the Indian Army during World War II, created on 1 March 1941 in Secunderabad. On 11 September 1941 it was shipped to the Iraq and later Iran. During 1942 and 1943 it was part of the Tenth Army. The division remained in the Middle East where it was disbanded on 15 October 1944 in Basra, Iraq. During World War II its commanders included Major-General James Noel Thomson, Major-General Arthur Holworthy, and Major-General B.H. Chappel.

Component units as of 11 September 1941
1st Duke of Yorks Own Skinners Horse
9th Indian Infantry Brigade
2nd Battalion, The West Yorkshire Regiment
3rd Battalion, 12th Frontier Force Regiment
3rd Battalion, 5th Mahratta Light Infantry
10th Indian Infantry Brigade
2nd Battalion, The Highland Light Infantry
3rd Battalion, 18th Royal Garhwal Rifles
4th Battalion, 10th Baluch Regiment
28th Field Regiment, Royal Artillery
20th Field Company, Indian Engineers
21st Field Company, Indian Engineers
44th Field Park Company, Indian Engineers

In addition, the 24th Indian Infantry Brigade was assigned or attached to the division at some time during World War II.

6th Mountain Division
After the Partition of India, the post-independence Indian Army reraised the 6th Division as the 6th Mountain Division in 1963. The division headquarters was initially at Naini Tal. The division is now headquartered at Bareilly and is part of the Central Command. The Garuda Division as it is known has been commanded amongst others by Maj Gen Siri Kanth Korla DSO, MC, and Maj Gen R Z Kabraji, AVSM, ADC. Kabraji succeeded Korla and was GOC from December 1966 to January 1969. Maj Gen (later Lt Gen) D K Chandorkar took over from Kabraji. The division later relocated to Bereilly.

The division took part in the 1965 and 1971 wars. It was moved to Kashmir in May 1999 during Op Vijay, however, it was not deployed for operations.
In 2005, Major General Gur Iqbal Singh, the then division commander, was found to be involved in a corruption case. He was tried and dismissed for corruption in late 2006.  At that time, Brigadier G. Illangovan commanded the 99 Mountain Brigade at Chaubatia and Brigadier D.S. Grewal commanded the 69 Mountain Brigade in Pithoragarh, both in Uttarakhand. Both brigadiers reported to Singh. As of June 2007, both brigadiers were accused of misdirection of monies.

References

External links
 

Indian World War II divisions
Divisions of the Indian Army
British Indian Army divisions
Military units and formations established in 1941
Military units and formations disestablished in 1944
Military units and formations of the British Empire in World War II